The equestrian events at the 2020 Summer Olympics in Tokyo featured three disciplines for both individual and team competitions.

Originally scheduled for 25 July – 8 August 2020, due to the COVID-19 pandemic, the games had been postponed with the equestrian events set for 24 July – 7 August 2021.

Qualification

The 200 quota places for equestrian were divided between the three disciplines (75 for jumping, 65 for eventing, and 60 for dressage). Teams in each discipline consisted of three horse and rider pairs; any NOC that qualified a team (20 teams for jumping, 15 each for eventing and dressage) also received 3 entries in the individual competition for that discipline. NOCs that did not qualify teams could earn one individual place in dressage and jumping, and up to two individual places in eventing, for a total of 15 entries in jumping and dressage and 20 for eventing. Teams qualify primarily through specific competitions (World Equestrian Games and continental tournaments), while individuals qualified through ranking. The host nation, Japan, automatically qualified a team in each discipline.

Participating nations
50 nations have qualified. Estonia, Israel, Latvia, Luxembourg, Singapore and Sri Lanka were scheduled to make their Olympic debuts in equestrian events.

Competitors

Officials
Appointment of officials was as follows:
Dressage
  Katrina Wüst (Ground Jury President)
  Andrew Gardner (Ground Jury Member)
  Francis Verbeek-van Rooij (Ground Jury Member)
  Hans-Christian Matthiesen (Ground Jury Member)
  Janet Foy (Ground Jury Member)
  Susie Hoevenaars (Ground Jury Member)
  Magnus Ringmark (Ground Jury Member)
  Mary Seefried (Technical Delegate)

Eventing
  Nick Burton (Ground Jury President)
  Christina Klingspor (Ground Jury Member)
  Jane Hamlin (Ground Jury Member)
  Derek Di Grazia (Course Designer)
  Philip Surl (Technical Delegate)

Jumping
  Carsten Soerlie (Ground Jury President)
  Kazuya Hirayama (Ground Jury Member)
  Kim Morrison (Ground Jury Member)
  Joachim Geilfus (Ground Jury Member)
  Santiago Varela (Course Designer)
  Louis Koninckx (Technical Delegate)

Competition format

Dressage
Teams are made of three athletes, all of whom are also competing for individual medals. Nations without a team can be represented by a single individual athlete.

Dressage competition starts with the Grand Prix, which serves as a qualifier for both team and individual competitions. Athletes are drawn into six heats of ten athletes each, with the opening three heats being scheduled for the first day, and the remaining three heats for the second day. Heats are drawn in such a way that no more than one athlete per NOC can be assigned to the same heat. Once the Grand Prix heats are concluded, team scores are decided by adding up individual scores of the respective team members. The top eight ranked teams qualify for the team final (Grand Prix Special), while the top two individual athletes from each heat, plus the next best six ranked athletes, qualify for the individual final (Grand Prix Freestyle).

Grand Prix Special, which is used to decide team medals, is a slightly more rigorous dressage test with emphasis on difficult transitions (such as collected walk - piaffe). Special is performed to music of athletes' choice, which, however, is not judged. As the slate is wiped clean after the Grand Prix, team medals are determined solely based on scores achieved in the Special. Nations taking part in the team final are allowed to enter a substitute athlete between the Grand Prix and up to two hours before the Special.

Grand Prix Freestyle is open for 18 athletes and is used to decide individual medals. Each athlete designs their own test for the Freestyle, which must be set to music and must contain 16 compulsory movements. Riders can tailor a test to their horses' strengths, as well as incorporate movements that are more difficult than those required in the Grand Prix or the Special (such as a pirouette in piaffe or flying changes on a curving line) in order to increase their scores. Individual medals are assigned based on scores in the Freestyle.

Eventing
Competitions for team and individual medals run concurrently. Each athlete, riding the same horse, performs a dressage test, a cross-country round, and a jumping round. Team medals are then awarded by adding together the scores of team members, from all three phases. The team with the lowest number of penalty points wins the gold. The top 25 individual athletes after the first jumping round perform a second, final, jumping round to determine individual medals. Therefore, those competing for individual glory complete one dressage test and cross-country round, and two jumping rounds.

Athletes who for various reasons fail to start or finish any of the phases are eliminated from the individual competition. Teams with eliminated athletes receive penalty points: 100 penalty points for each eliminated athlete during dressage and jumping phases, and 200 penalty points for each eliminated athlete during cross-country phase. While they are excluded from the individual event, eliminated athletes may continue to compete in the following phases for their teams, unless they were eliminated for lameness, fall of horse, abuse of horse or otherwise disqualified. Teams can additionally bring forward a reserve athlete at any point of the competition. In such case, the respective team is awarded 20 additional penalty points.

Jumping
Individual and team competitions are run separately.

Individual competition is up first and it takes two competition days. First competition day serves as a qualifier, where a total of 75 athletes may start. Each athlete tackles the same course, which includes 12 to 14 numbered obstacles. Athletes are ranked based on accumulated number of penalty points, and top 30 advance to individual final. In case of a tie for the last qualification place, athletes are separated by the time of their round. Individual final is held on a different course that includes 12 to 15 numbered obstacles. Athletes are once again ranked based on accumulated number of penalty points. If two or more athletes are tied for a medal position, the tie is resolved in a jump-off.

First day of team competition serves as a qualifier, and is opened to a total of 20 teams. At the end of the qualifier, teams receive their placing by adding up the penalties incurred by the three team members. Athletes who withdraw or are eliminated or who retire from the competition will not be given a score. Teams with one athlete who has withdrawn, retired or been eliminated from the team qualifier will  be placed according to the combined penalties incurred by the two athletes who completed the competition. Teams in which all three athletes completed the competition without being eliminated or retiring shall be placed before teams with only two athletes who completed the competition without being eliminated or retiring. Teams with two athletes who have withdrawn and/or retired and/or been eliminated from the competition will be eliminated. The top 10 teams based on the qualifier results advance to team final. In case of a tie for the last qualification place, teams are separated by the combined time of their three team members. Team final is held on a different course. Teams are once again ranked based on accumulated number of penalty points of their team members. If two or more teams are tied for a medal position, the tie is resolved in a jump-off.

Competition schedule 
All times are Japan Standard Time (UTC+9).

Medal summary

Medalists

See also
Equestrian at the 2018 Asian Games
Equestrian at the 2018 Summer Youth Olympics
Equestrian at the 2019 Pan American Games
Equestrian at the 2020 Summer Paralympics
Equestrian at the 2022 World Cup in Denmark

References

External links
 Results book 

 
2020
2020 Summer Olympics events
2021 in equestrian
Equestrian sports competitions in Japan